Primary, alternate, contingency and emergency (PACE) is a methodology used to build a communication plan. The method requires the author to determine the different stakeholders or parties that need to communicate and then determine, if possible, the best four forms of communication between each of those parties. PACE also designates the order in which an element will move through available communications systems until contact can be established with the desired distant element(s).  Ideally, each method will be completely separate and independent of the other systems of communication.  For each method, the receiver must first sense which one the sender is using and then respond.

According to the United States Army, a PACE communication plan "designates the order in which an element will move through available communications systems until contact can be established with the desired distant element."

A PACE-based communication plan exists for a specific mission or task, not a specific unit, because the plan must consider both intra- and inter-unit sharing of information.  An organization may have multiple plans for different situations, activities, and/or partners.

Order and scope 
The PACE plan system is expressed as an order of communication precedence list; primary, alternate, contingency, and emergency. The plan designates the order in which a group will move through available communications systems until contact can be established.  The plan does not designate such things as the exact radio channel or talk group to be used if you are using a radio, but the order in which you would plan to use the radio and agreed upon method of communications between groups.

A PACE plan is not a frequency plan (which details frequency allocation and radio spectrum characteristics) or band plan (to avoid interference) or channel plan (which details which channels users listen/talk upon) or deployment plan (which details the users' radios types and locations).

Development of PACE plans 
Emergency management and communications managers should coordinate the development of PACE plans for the many different functions and departments within your organization to ensure that Incident Command can maintain critical communication links. Departmental PACE plans should be coordinated with emergency management and the communications team.  It is critical that individual departments nest their plan within the larger Emergency Plan to ensure that the organization has the resources to execute the plan and reduce unnecessary duplication of assets. Developing comprehensive PACE plans will not ensure perfect communications in a disaster, but may help to clear one more layer in the fog and friction found in every emergency situation.

References

Acronyms
Communication